Pierre Fouyssac (born 17 March 1995) is a French rugby union player. He currently plays as a centre for Toulouse in the Top 14.

Born in Lot-et-Garonne, he began his career with Agen before moving to Toulouse in 2018.

Honours

Toulouse
Top 14: 2018–19, 2020–21

References

External links
 Stade Toulousain
 EPCR
 All Rugby
 It's Rugby

French rugby union players
French rugby sevens players
Rugby union centres
SU Agen Lot-et-Garonne players
Stade Toulousain players
France international rugby sevens players
Sportspeople from Agen
Living people
1995 births